Franklin E. Plummer (died September 24, 1847) was a U.S. Representative from Mississippi.

Born in Massachusetts, Plummer moved to Mississippi and taught school in Copiah County, Mississippi. After completing his law studies he was admitted to the bar and commenced practice in Westville, Mississippi. He held various local offices and served as a member of the State house of representatives, as well as founding the town of Pittsburg (now part of Grenada).

Plummer was elected as a Jacksonian to the Twenty-second and Twenty-third Congresses (March 4, 1831 – March 3, 1835). He was an unsuccessful candidate for the United States Senate. He died in Jackson, Mississippi, on September 24, 1847.

References

1847 deaths
Members of the Mississippi House of Representatives
Year of birth unknown
Jacksonian members of the United States House of Representatives from Mississippi
19th-century American politicians